Sudhir Chaudhary may refer to:

 Sudhir Chaudhary (journalist), Indian journalist
 Sudhir Kumar Chaudhary (born 1983), fan of the Indian cricket team and Sachin Tendulkar